The Arab world consists of 22 states.

The most populous Arab state is Egypt, the North African nation with a population of  million residents. Comoros, the Indian Ocean nation is the least populated, with around  inhabitants. The largest city in the Arab World is Cairo, Egypt.

Population growth

The population of the Arab world as estimated by the UN in 2017 was 414,727,833, But there's no exact figures of the annual population growth, fertility rate, or mortality rate are known to exist.

Most of the Arab population is concentrated in and around major urban areas.

Islam and Christianity were founded in areas that are now Arab countries. Consequently, the majority of the Arab citizens are either Muslims or Christians. The Arab countries host several holy cities and other religiously significant locations, including Alexandria, Mecca, Medina, Kirkuk, Arbil, and Baghdad. Sunni Muslims constitute vast majority of the Arab world's residents. However, Shi'a make up the slight majority in areas of Iraq and Bahrain.

Christianity is the second largest religion, with over 20 million Christians living in countries such as Lebanon, Egypt, Iraq, Bahrain, Syria, Kuwait and Jordan. There are smaller Jewish populations living mainly in the western part of the Arab world. Places such as Bahrain, Morocco, Algeria, Yemen, Tunisia, Syria, Egypt and Iraq all have Jewish populations. However, most Arab Jews emigrated from the Arab states to Israel after its founding in 1948. Other minor religions such as Druze religion, the Baháʼí Faith, Mandeanism, Yazdanism, Zoroastrianism, Shabak religion and Yarsan are practiced on a much smaller scale.

Arab countries by religion (percentage of population)

Language

Arabic is the official and most spoken language in the Arab world, but additional languages are often used in the daily lives of some citizens. Currently, three major languages other than Arabic are used widely: Kurdish in northern Iraq and parts of Syria, Berber in North Africa, and Somali in the Horn of Africa.

There are several minority languages that are still spoken today, such as Afar, Armenian, Hebrew, Nubian, Persian, Aramaic, and Turkish.
Arabic is a non-native language to 20% of the Arab population, with the Somali, Berber and Kurdish languages considered the most widely used after Arabic.

On the other hand, Arabic is divided into over 27 dialects. Almost every Arab state has at least one local dialect of its own. they can be divided into 5 major branches, the Peninsula Arabic, which is the Arabic used in the Arabian peninsula, with around 9 main dialects, Arabic of the Nile Valley, which includes the Masri, Saedi, Sudanese and Chadic Arabic, the Arabic of the Fertile Crescent, which includes the Bedawi, Levant Arabic, Iraqi Arabic and North Mesopotamian Arabic, the Magharbi Arabic, which includes the Dialects used in Mauritania, Morocco, Libya, Algeria and Tunisia, also another category of Arabic is the other isolated dialects of Arabic, like the Judeo-Arabic, Mediterranean Arabic, Nubi Arabic, and the juba Arabic, which have greatly been affected by these communities' own pronunciation, culture and native tongue.

Arab world populations
Many Arab countries in the Persian Gulf have sizable (10–30%) non-Arab populations. Iraq, Bahrain, Kuwait, Qatar, United Arab Emirates and Oman have a Persian speaking minority. The same countries also have Hindi-Urdu speakers and Filipinos as sizable minority. Balochi speakers are a good size minority in Oman. Additionally, countries like Bahrain, UAE, Oman and Kuwait have significant non-Arab and non-Muslim minorities (10–20%) like Hindus and Christians from India, Pakistan, Bangladesh, Nepal and the Philippines.

Many non-Arab countries bordering the Arab states have large Arab populations, such as in Chad, Israel, Mali, Niger, Senegal and Turkey.

The table below shows the distribution of populations in the Arab world and Israel, as well as the official language(s) within the various Arab states.

Armenians

The Arab world has between 400,000 and 500,000 Armenians inhabiting its geographical area. Armenians are largely concentrated in countries such as Lebanon 150,000 - 250,000 and Syria 100,000 to 150,000 as well as Palestine, and to a lesser degree Egypt and Iraq, but Armenians can also be found in countries like Qatar and the UAE. These Armenians are economic migrants from Lebanon and Syria.

Prior to World War I, there were some 2,000–3,000 Armenians in Palestine, mostly in Jerusalem. From 1915 and onward, thousands of Armenian genocide survivors from Cilicia (Adana Vilayet) found refuge, and settled in Palestine, increasing its Armenian population. In 1925, around 15,000 Armenians are believed to have lived in all of Palestine, with the majority in Jerusalem. During Mandatory Palestine period, the number of Armenians is estimated to have reached up to 20,000. However, the 1931 British census showed only 3,524 Armenians in all of Palestine.

A large number of Armenian monks are recorded to have settled in Jerusalem as early as the 4th century, after the uncovering of Christian holy places in the city. However, the first written records are from the 5th century. Jerusalem is thus considered the oldest living diaspora community outside the Armenian homeland. Nowadays, there are estimated 7500 living in the region of Historical Palestine.

Most Armenians are Christians mainly following the Orthodox Armenian Apostolic Church. The church has one of its two headquarters in Antelias, Lebanon, called The Catholicosate of the Great House of Cilicia (the other being in Armenia called Mother See of Holy Etchmiadzin). There are also Armenian Catholics. The world headquarters of the Armenian Catholic Church is also located in Beirut, Lebanon (and historically in Bzoummar, Lebanon). There are also a minority Armenian Evangelical Protestants. The Middle East headquarters of the Armenian Evangelical Church is in Beirut called Union of the Armenian Evangelical Churches in the Near East.

Assyrians
Assyrians (also known as Chaldo-Assyrians) can be found in Iraq, north eastern Syria, and to a lesser degree north western Iran and south eastern Turkey. They are an ancient Semitic people who retain Aramaic as a spoken language. They are exclusively Christian and are descendants of the ancient pre Arab  Assyrians/Mesopotamians. Almost all Christians in Iraq are ethnic Assyrians, where they number approximately 400,000. 500,000 are in Syria but are harder to identify, because they are often included in with the general Christian population and speak Arabic, however the Christians of the Tur Abdin and Al Hasakah regions in the north east are predominantly Assyrian.

Berbers

Berbers are an ethnic group indigenous to North Africa. They are distributed in an area stretching from the Atlantic Ocean to the Siwa Oasis in Egypt, and from the Mediterranean Sea to the Niger River. Historically, they spoke Berber languages, which together form the Berber branch of the Afro-Asiatic family. Since the Muslim conquest of North Africa in the seventh century, a large number of Berbers inhabiting the Maghreb have acquired different degrees of knowledge of varieties of Maghrebi Arabic.

Circassians
Circassians are a people who originate in the North Caucasus. They are predominantly Muslim, and can be found in Iraq, Syria, Jordan, Israel and Lebanon in relatively small numbers.

Coptic Christians
Egyptian Coptic Christians are a religious group who do not usually identify themselves as Arabic and they follow the Coptic Orthodox Church. They place heavy emphasis on the Egyptian aspect of their identity and their Christian heritage. Their numbers are heavily disputed but are estimated to compromise roughly 5.35% of the Egyptian population. They are mainly followers of the Coptic Orthodox Church of Alexandria, there are however a minority among them who are members of the Coptic Catholic Church, and an even smaller group who belong to the Coptic Evangelical Church. The Egyptian Coptic language, which is a late script that was developed in Roman Egypt, written in the Greek alphabet and descending from the late form of the Egyptian language of ancient Egypt, continues to be used as the liturgical language of the Coptic Orthodox Church of Alexandria.

Jews

The Jewish tribes of Arabia were Arabian tribes professing the Jewish faith that inhabited the Arabian Peninsula before and during the advent of Islam.  It is not always clear whether they were originally Israelite in ancestry, genealogically Arab tribes that converted to Judaism, or a mixture of both. In Islamic tradition the Jewish tribes of the Hejaz were seen as the offspring of the ancient Israelites. According to Muslim sources, they spoke a language other than Arabic, which Al-Tabari claims was Persian. This implies they were connected to the major Jewish center in Babylon. Certain Jewish traditions records the existence of nomadic tribes such as the Rechabites that converted to Judaism in antiquity. The tribes collapsed with the rise of Islam, with many either converting or fleeing the Arab peninsula. Some of those tribes are thought to have merged into Yemenite Jewish community, while others, like the residents of Yatta consider themselves Islamized descendants of Khaybar, a Jewish tribe of Arabia.

Jews from Arab countries – included in the Mizrahi Jewish communities– are not categorized as, and do not consider themselves to be, Arabs, as Jews are a separate nation from Arabs, with different history and culture. However, sometimes the term Arab Jews is used to describe Jews from Arab countries, though the term is highly controversial. Sociologist Sammy Smooha stated "This ("Arab Jews") term does not hold water. It is absolutely not a parallel to 'Arab Christian'". Those who dispute the historicity of the term make the claim that Middle Eastern Jews are similar to Assyrians, Berbers, and other Middle Eastern groups who live in Arab societies as distinct minority groups with distinct identity and therefore are not categorized as Arabs.

Kurds
In the northern regions of Iraq (15-20%) and Syria (10%) live a group called the Kurds, an Indo-European ethnic group who speak Kurdish, a language closely related to Persian and using Persian alphabet, except in Turkey where Kurdish is written using a Latin alphabet orthography. The majority of Kurds are Sunni Muslim, others are Alevi Muslim, with Christian and Yarsan minorities. The nationalist aspiration for self-rule or for a state of Kurdistan has created conflict between Kurdish minorities and their governments in Iraq, Iran, Syria and Turkey

Mandaeans
Mandaeans, sometimes also called Sabians, are a people found mainly in southern Iraq. Their numbers total no more than 70,000. They follow Mandaeism, a gnostic religion.

Mhallami
Mhallami are a tiny minority unknown origins who have converted to Islam.

Nubians

Nubians, found in Northern Sudan and Southern Egypt, are a different ethnicity from their northern and southern neighbors in Egypt and Sudan, numbering 1.7 million in Sudan and Egypt. The Nubian people in Sudan inhabit the region between Wadi Halfa in the north and Aldaba in the south. The main Nubian groups from north to south are the Halfaweyen, Sikut (Sickkout), Mahas, and Danagla. They speak different dialects of the Nubian language.

Ancient Nubians were famous for their vast wealth, their trade between Central Africa and the lower Nile valley civilizations, including Egypt, their skill and precision with the bow, their 23-letter alphabet, the use of deadly poison on the heads of their arrows, their great military, their advanced civilization, and their century-long rule over the united upper and lower Egyptian kingdoms.

Roma
Roma are to be found in many parts of the Middle East and North Africa; their numbers are unknown. They speak their own language and may loosely follow the predominant religion of the country they live in.

Shabaks
Shabaks are mainly found in Iraq, they are either Muslim or follow native religions. They are also related to Kurds, but like the Yazidi, emphasise their separate identity.

Somalis
Somali and Arabic are the two official languages in Somalia, both of which belong to the Afro-Asiatic family. Article 3 of the constitution outlines the country's founding principles, establishing it as a Muslim state, and a member of the Arab and African nations. About 85% of local residents are ethnic Somalis, who have historically inhabited the northern part of the country. Many self-identify as Somali instead of Arab despite centuries-old ties to Arabia. There are also a number of Benadiris, Bravanese, Bantus, Bajunis, Ethiopians, Indians, Pakistanis, Persians, Britons and Italians.

Djibouti, whose demographics are approximately 60% Somali and 35% Afar, is in a similar position. Arabic is one of the official languages, 94% of the nation's population is Muslim, and its location on the Red Sea places it in close proximity to the Arabian Peninsula. Somali and Afar are also recognized national languages.

Turks

The Arab world is home to sizeable populations of Turks throughout North Africa, the Levant, and the Arabian Peninsula.

There is a notable Turkish minority in Egypt; prior to the Egyptian revolution in 1919, the ruling and upper classes were mainly Turkish,  or of Turkish descent (see Turks in Egypt), which was part of the heritage from the Ottoman rule of Egypt.

In the Levant the Turks are scattered throughout the region. In Iraq and Syria the Turkish minorities are commonly referred to as "Turkmen", "Turkman" and "Turcoman"; these terms have historically been used to designate Turkish speakers in Arab areas, or Sunni Muslims in Shitte areas. The majority of Iraqi Turkmen and Syrian Turkmen are the descendants of Ottoman Turkish settlers. and share close cultural and linguistic ties with Turkey, particularly the Anatolian region. In 2013 the Iraqi Ministry of Planning estimated that Iraqi Turkmen numbered 3 million out of the country's 34.7 million inhabitants (approximately 9% of the total population). Estimates of the Syrian Turkmen population range from several hundred thousand to 3.5 million. There is also Turkish minorities located in Jordan (Turks in Jordan) and Lebanon (Turks in Lebanon). In Lebanon, they live mainly in the villages of Aydamun and Kouachra in the Akkar District, as well as in Baalbek, Beirut, and Tripoli. The Lebanese Turks number approximately 80,000. However, there has also been a recent influx of Syrian Turkmen refugees (125,000 to 150,000 in 2015) who now outnumber the long establish Ottoman descended Turkish minority.

In the Arabian Peninsula, there are Turkish minorities who have lived in the region since the Ottoman era. The Turks live predominately in Saudi Arabia (see Turks in Saudi Arabia) and Yemen (see Turks in Yemen).

Yazidi
The Yazidi are a religious Kurdish community who represent an ancient religion that is linked to Zoroastrianism. They number 500,000 in Iraq and 14,000 in Syria.

Modern identities

North Africans

North Africans are the inhabitants of the North Africa (Morocco, Algeria, Tunisia, Libya and Egypt). Maghrebis mostly speak Maghrebi Arabic, which is descended from Classical Arabic and has a marked Berber substratum, while Egyptians speak Egyptian Arabic which is mainly based on Coptic grammar rather than Classical Arabic.

In 647 AD (the year 27 of the Hijrah), the first Muslim expedition to Africa took place. By 700 AD, the area had been conquered and converted to the Islamic faith. We know little of the early Islamic town, but by the tenth century the area outside of the fortress was once more filled with houses: on the site of the Roman baths over twelve of these were excavated, with large courtyards surrounded by long, thin, rooms.

After ruling over Cairo, the Fatimids left the rule in Tunisia and parts of eastern Algeria to the Zirids (972–1148). The invasion of Tunisia which was known as Ifriqiya, was done by the Banu Hilal, an Arab tribe encouraged by the Fatimids to seize North Africa.

Genetics

Y-Chromosome
Listed here are the human Y-chromosome DNA haplogroups in main regions of the Arab world (Maghreb, Mashriq and Arabian peninsula).

Comparison of the members

See also
Demographics of the Middle East and North Africa
List of largest cities of the Arab world
List of Arab countries by population
List of Arab League countries by GDP (nominal)

References

Arab League
Arabic-speaking people
Arabic-language culture
Arabic-speaking countries and territories